| birth_place = Porto Alegre, Brazil
| position = Left-back
| youthyears1 = 1994–1995
| youthclubs1 = Grêmio 
| years1 = 1996–1997 
| years2 = 1998 
| years3 = 1998–2002 
| years4 = 2002–2005 
| years5 = 2004–2005 
| years6 = 2005 
| years7 = 2006 
| years8 = 2006–2007 
| years9 = 2008
| years10 = 2008–2009
| years11 = 2009–2013
| years12 = 2015–2016
| clubs1 = Vasco da Gama 
| clubs2 = Grêmio 
| clubs3 = Beira-Mar
| clubs4 = Benfica 
| clubs5 = → Belenenses (loan)
| clubs6 = Benfica B 
| clubs7 = Juventude
| clubs8 = Atromitos 
| clubs9 = Hanoi FC
| clubs10 = Beira-Mar
| clubs11 = Hanoi FC
| clubs12 = Beira-Mar
| caps1 = 14
| goals1 = 4
| caps2 = 8
| goals2 = 5
| caps3 = 77
| goals3 = 7
| caps4 = 24
| goals4 = 1
| caps5 = 10
| goals5 = 0
| caps6 = 2
| goals6 = 1
| caps7 = 
| goals7 = 
| caps8 = 9
| goals8 = 0
| caps9 = 
| goals9 = 
| caps10 = 26
| goals10 = 1
| caps11 = 88
| goals11 = 6
| caps12 = 18
| goals12 = 0
|totalcaps=276
|totalgoals=23
|manageryears1 = 2021–
|managerclubs1 = Becamex Bình Dương (Assistant)
|pcupdate = 28 April 2021
|ntupdate = 28 April 2021
}}
Cristiano Rocha Canedo Roland (born 4 October 1976), known simply as Cristiano, is a retired Brazilian footballer who played as a left-back.

He started at Grêmio and moved to Vasco da Gama in 1996, where he won the Brasileirão in 1997. In 1998, he signed with Beira-Mar winning a Portuguese Cup in 1999 and transferring to Benfica in 2002, where he won another Portuguese Cup in 2004. In 2007, he moved to the V-League, playing for Hanoi T&T on two different spells, winning three major titles.

Career
Born in Porto Alegre, Cristiano started at Grêmio in 1994, and spending two years in their youth system. In 1996, he moved to Vasco da Gama and helped them win the Brasileirão in 1997. After a short period back at Grêmio, Cristiano moved abroad and joined Beira-Mar in 1998. He was sparsely used in his first year, that ended with mixed results: relegation in the Primeira Divisão and the conquering the Portuguese Cup. His influence grew in the following three seasons and he became known as free-kick specialist. In 2001–02, Cristiano scored three league goals, two of them against Porto, and in both times, Beira-Mar won.

In June 2002, Benfica signed him on a four-year deal, with Diogo Luís and Toni going in the other direction on loan deals. From early on, Cristiano struggled with competition from Ricardo Rocha, and on occasions, Cabral. He only made his debut on 3 November 2002 against Santa Clara, but with the arrival of José Antonio Camacho, he began playing much more frequently, finishing the season with 14 appearances. The following season, Cristiano was set to reunite with Jesualdo Ferreira at Braga, but the loan deal fell through. Still, Cristiano started 8 league games in the first half of the season, until the arrival of Fyssas in January. From then on, he became a bench player and never returned to the starting eleven. In May, he added his second trophy in Portugal, after winning the 2003–04 Taça de Portugal.

In July 2004, he was loaned to Belenenses for one year. Initially, he was an undisputed starter playing six games in a row, but an injury in late October, cause him to lost his place to Cabral and José Sousa. In 2005–06, Cristiano could not find a team and was placed in Benfica B, but mutually terminated his contract on late September 2005. After Benfica, he spent some time at Juventude in the Série A, before moving to Atromitos in the Greek league. He played for Hanoi T&T in 2007 and returned to Beira-Mar in July 2008, playing 26 games in the Liga de Honra. In 2009, Cristiano moved back to Hanoi T&T and won the league in 2010 and 2013, retiring in 2013. In August 2015, he came out of retirement for a third stint at Beira-Mar, after they were relegated to the Aveiro FA's second division.

Honours

Vasco da Gama
Brasileirão: 1997

Beira-Mar
Taça de Portugal: 1998–99

Benfica
Taça de Portugal: 2003–04

Hanoi T&T
V-League: 2010, 2013
Vietnamese Super Cup: 2010

References
General
 

Specific

1976 births
Living people
Footballers from Porto Alegre
Brazilian footballers
CR Vasco da Gama players
Grêmio Foot-Ball Porto Alegrense players
Esporte Clube Juventude players
S.L. Benfica footballers
S.L. Benfica B players
C.F. Os Belenenses players
S.C. Beira-Mar players
Atromitos F.C. players
Hanoi FC players
V.League 1 players
Brazilian expatriate footballers
Brazilian expatriate sportspeople in Vietnam
Brazilian expatriate sportspeople in Portugal
Expatriate footballers in Vietnam
Expatriate footballers in Greece
Expatriate footballers in Portugal
Association football defenders